The Clemson–Georgia football rivalry is an American college football rivalry between the Clemson Tigers and Georgia Bulldogs.  It was for many years a spirited "border" rivalry between the two schools that are separated by a mere 70 miles. They met annually from 1897 to 1916, and again from 1962 to 1987 (aside from 1966 and 1972).  The majority of meetings in over the first half century took place in Athens and Augusta, Georgia until 1967, not long after Clemson College expanded to University status, when the series shifted to become a more traditional, annual home-away series.  Georgia leads the series 43–18–4, with 42 games played in Georgia, 22 games played in South Carolina, and one game played in North Carolina.  Since 1987, the two schools have played intermittently.

Series history

Early history
More than just geography dictated from the beginning that the two teams would be rivals, though the spirit of animosity between them certainly was stoked by the fact that scarcely 70 miles separate the Athens and Clemson campuses.  The history of the series stretches back to the earliest days of both football programs, which sprang from a common fountainhead: Walter Riggs, who founded Clemson football, learned the sport as a student at Auburn, where he played for George Petrie who learned the sport as a student at Johns Hopkins, where Petrie acquired his passion for the game with classmate Charles Herty, who founded Georgia football.  That shared heritage and close proximity have combined to produce many family ties connecting the neighboring programs. Tavarres King and Jay Romeare two of several Georgia players whose fathers played for Clemson, whereas former Tiger quarterbacks Cullen Harper and Jon Richt were the sons of Bulldogs lineman Jeff Harper and Bulldogs head coach Mark Richt, respectively. In one instance, a president of what was then Clemson College (Patrick Hues Mell, 1902-1910) was the son of former chancellor of the University of Georgia (Patrick H. Mell, 1878-1888). To complicate matters still further, football players Jimmy Orr (who transferred from Clemson to UGA) and Wynn Kopp (who transferred from the Georgia to Clemson) each attended both institutions.

The two schools first met in 1897, on the Georgia campus in Athens. The Bulldogs won 24–0.  The series went back and forth with each team enjoying winning streaks over the other, usually by lopsided margins. Georgia won the first three games by a combined score of 55–8, and Clemson won the next seven with a combined score of 185-10, during and around the John Heisman era—the last five by shut-out.  Following the 6–0 defeat to the Tigers in 1906, Georgia began several winning streaks against the smaller Clemson Military College for the next few decades.

After the 1921 game, the series was put on hold. The two teams played on occasion over the next forty years, until the schools' athletic departments agreed to renew the annual rivalry game on a home and home basis.

Annual renewal: 1962–1987
The schools continued to play intermittently before and after WWII, mostly in Athens, until a standard, annual home-home series was contracted beginning in 1967.  Clemson shifted from a small, all-male military institution to becoming a co-educational, civilian college in 1955, and expanded to meet University requirements in 1964.  The matchups began to become more competitive as Clemson's athletic programs, along with the University, grew substantially in the 1970s.  Twice during this period, beginning in 1978, the Bulldogs dealt Clemson their only defeat of the season. However, Danny Ford's Clemson team did return the favor in 1981 on their way to a national championship, giving Bulldog great Herschel Walker his only regular season defeat in his three years at Georgia.

But it wasn't until the 1980s that the rivalry became relevant on a national stage, when both programs rose to national prominence. That was also the time that the series became known for its closely contested, hard-fought games. In 1984, Kevin Butler kicked a 60-yard field goal to upset #2 Clemson 26–23; David Treadwell returned the favor with game winning kicks in 1986 and 1987 to give Clemson 31–28 and 21–20 victories.

The current intermittent rivalry
Following the 1987 game, the expansion of the SEC schedule from six to seven games prompted Georgia to stop playing non-conference opponents Clemson and South Carolina each year. Instead, Georgia would alternate two-game series against the two schools, with Georgia scheduling home-and-home series versus Clemson for 1990 and 1991, 1994 and 1995, 1998 and 1999, and 2002 and 2003. This was the end of the yearly rivalry. With the expansion of the SEC in 1992 and the eight-game conference schedule, the 1998 and 1999 games were canceled.  Since 1987, the schools have played four home and home series with each other, playing a total of eight times. Clemson won the first game of the most recent home and home, a 38–35 victory in Clemson, with Georgia winning the second 45–21.

The two schools renewed the rivalry at Bank of America Stadium, as the 2021 season opener game.  Georgia won the game 10–3, with neither team scoring an offensive touchdown. Georgia’s defense held Clemson to 2 yards rushing. The two teams also scheduled to play the 2024 season opener in the Chick-fil-A Kickoff Game in Atlanta. The two programs have planned home-and-away series in 2029-30 and 2032-33.

Memorable games

1978: Georgia gives Clemson their only loss
On the second weekend of the 1978 season, #8 Clemson traveled to Athens to take on the Bulldogs. But Georgia's defense dominated the game, keeping the Tigers off the scoreboard in a 12–0 shutout. The game later turned out to be very significant, as Clemson rallied to win the remainder of its regular season games, but were dropped from consideration by all the major bowl games due to the ugly loss, effectively killing the Tigers' chances at a national title.

1981: Clemson gives Georgia their first loss
In a bit of role reversal from 1978, #4 Georgia traveled to Clemson for an early season game, but Clemson's defense stood tall and caused a miserable day for Herschel Walker, including forcing him to fumble near Clemson's goal line. Fueled by a touchdown pass from Homer Jordan to Perry Tuttle, the Tigers pulled off the 13–3 upset. The loss turned out to cost Georgia a shot at back to back national championships, as Clemson finished the season unbeaten and won the national title following their 22–15 1982 Orange Bowl victory over #4 Nebraska, while Georgia finished at #6 after losing 24–20 to #8 Pittsburgh in the Sugar Bowl.

1984: Butler kicks game-winning field goal
The 1984 game between 2nd-ranked and heavily favored Clemson and 20th-ranked Georgia went down as an instant classic. Clemson raced to a 20–6 lead and appeared well on their way. However, Georgia fought their way back into the game with two quick touchdowns. Tied at 20, Georgia coach Vince Dooley called on Kevin Butler, who had been forced to switch from linebacker to kicker in high school, to attempt a 46-yard field goal to give Georgia the lead. He made it, and Georgia went up 23–20.

But the Tigers, who had just surrendered 17 unanswered points, came right back with a field goal of their own to tie it at 23 with two minutes left. Georgia mounted one final drive that stalled at the Clemson 42, and Dooley sent Butler back on to attempt a 60-yard field goal - which would be the longest in Georgia history. Butler's kick split the uprights with 11 seconds left to give Georgia a 26–23 victory.

1986: Treadwell returns the favor
The 1986 game appeared to be a shootout in the early going, with each offense establishing a rhythm and scoring three quick touchdowns in the first half. Georgia and Clemson combined for nearly 400 yards in the first half alone, but three Clemson turnovers prevented the Tigers from pulling away. Clemson appeared to gain some breathing room on a QB sneak from Rodney Williams that resulted in a touchdown early in the third quarter and an ensuing interception, but Williams himself was intercepted at the Georgia 5 yard line. A few plays later, Georgia receiver Freddy Lane broke free for a 78-yard touchdown, tying the score again, this time at 28 to end the third quarter.

Both offenses suddenly stalled in the fourth quarter. First, Clemson drove deep into Georgia territory, but David Treadwell missed the field goal. Then, Georgia drove down to the Clemson 15 yard line before Clemson recovered a fumble. The Tigers could do nothing, and punted. Georgia's offense was stymied as well, and punted right back to Clemson with 1:11 left.

Rodney Williams calmly directed Clemson down the field inside the Georgia 30, when Clemson coach Danny Ford called a timeout with four seconds left to give Treadwell a chance at redemption. He hit it to give Clemson a 31–28 victory.

1987: Treadwell returns the favor again
In the final game of the annual rivalry, Georgia running backs Lars Tate and Rodney Hampton had quite impressive performances against Clemson on this day in Death Valley. But in the end, it was Clemson's defense that was the story. Trailing 20–16 with five minutes left, a trio of Clemson defenders sacked Georgia quarterback James Jackson in the end zone for a safety to cut it to 20–18. Clemson took the free kick and immediately faced a third and seven. Clemson tailback Terry Allen took a pitch and picked up 16 yards for the first down to keep the drive alive.

Clemson continued to methodically punch its way down to the Georgia 5 yard line, when Danny Ford called timeout and sent on David Treadwell to try to win the game, just like he had done the year before. Just like the year before, Treadwell's kick was good, giving Clemson a 21–20 victory in the final game of the annual rivalry.

2002: Shockley rescues Bulldogs
In the first renewal of the rivalry since 1995, Georgia starting quarterback David Greene was ineffective for most of the game - just 12–27 for 67 yards - and Clemson had a 28–21 lead heading into the fourth quarter. At that point, Georgia coach Mark Richt inserted backup freshman QB DJ Shockley (who had rushed for a second quarter touchdown) into the game for the rest of the way to try to save the 8th ranked Bulldogs.

With 12:35 left, Shockley connected with Terrance Edwards for a 24-yard touchdown pass to tie it at 28. After Clemson went three and out, Damian Gary returned the punt 40 yards to set up a 43-yard field goal by Billy Bennett. He made it to put Georgia up 31–28. Clemson had one more chance to tie the game or win, and moved into field goal range. But Aaron Hunt's game-tying field goal attempt from 46 yards out fell short, and Georgia survived 31–28.

2013: Boyd outduels Murray in shootout
On the opening weekend of the 2013 season, #8 Clemson hosted #5 Georgia.  College GameDay traveled to Clemson for just the second time ever, and the game was sold out almost immediately.

The game instantly turned into a shootout. Georgia took a 21–14 second quarter lead on touchdowns by Todd Gurley, Quayvon Hicks and Keith Marshall, but from that point, Clemson quarterback Tajh Boyd took over. After rushing for a first quarter touchdown, Boyd did it again to tie the game at 21. Then he connected with Zac Brooks and Stanton Seckinger for touchdowns. Clemson held a 38–28 lead late in the fourth quarter, but Georgia QB Aaron Murray led the Bulldogs back, diving into the end zone to cut it to 38–35 with 1:19 left. Clemson recovered the onside kick to hold on for the victory.

2021: A low-scoring slugfest
During the opening weekend of the 2021 season, #3 Clemson and #5 Georgia reunited in a highly-anticipated neutral site matchup in the Duke's Mayo Classic. Both starting quarterbacks, Georgia's JT Daniels and Clemson's DJ Uiagalelei, were considered pre-season Heisman hopefuls. However, it would be the defenses that ruled the day in a 10-3 defensive standoff. The Georgia defense made a strong first impression by holding Clemson to 2 rushing yards, sacking Uiagalelei seven times, and scoring the game's only touchdown on a 74-yard pick-six late in the first half. It was the first of many strong performances by the historically dominant Bulldog defense, which would propel the team to a 14-1 record and the program's first national championship in 41 years.

Game results

See also 
 List of NCAA college football rivalry games

References

College football rivalries in the United States
Clemson Tigers football
Georgia Bulldogs football